Dennis Dawson (born September 28, 1949) is a Canadian politician and administrator. Dawson is a retired Canadian Senator and former Member of Parliament (MP) in the House of Commons.

Born in Quebec City, Quebec, Dawson's first entry into politics was spending five years as a trustee on the Commission des écoles catholiques de Québec. After that, Dawson represented the riding of Louis-Hébert, Quebec in the House of Commons from 1977 to 1984. He is a former Parliamentary Secretary to the Minister of Labour and former Parliamentary Secretary to the Minister of Employment and Immigration.

In 2004, he ran in the federal election as a "star" candidate for the Liberal Party of Canada in the riding of Beauport but was beaten by Bloc Québécois candidate Christian Simard, losing by a ratio of nearly 2:1.

On August 2, 2005, Dawson was appointed to the Canadian Senate on the recommendation of Prime Minister Paul Martin. He represented the Liberal Party of Canada in the Upper Chamber until Justin Trudeau's removal of Liberal Senators from the Canadian Liberal caucus in 2014.

With the Senate Liberal Caucus facing losing official parliamentary caucus status in 2020 with a third of its caucus facing mandatory retirements on their turning age 75, Senator Joseph Day announced that the Senate Liberal Caucus had been dissolved and a new Progressive Senate Group formed in its wake, with the entire membership joining the new group, including this senator.

With Day's mandatory retirement in January 2020, on December 12, 2019, Jane Cordy tweeted that her colleagues in the PSG had selected her as the new leader, ostensibly effective that same date. Additionally, she subsequently announced later that day Terry Mercer would be moving into the Whip/Caucus Chair role, that Dawson would be become the new Deputy Leader, and that the interim monikers were being removed at the same time.

He has two daughters, Cindy and Kathryn-Anne, and a son named Julian.

References

External links
 
 Liberal Senate Forum

1949 births
Anglophone Quebec people
Canadian senators from Quebec
Liberal Party of Canada MPs
Liberal Party of Canada senators
Progressive Senate Group
Senate Liberal Caucus
Living people
Members of the House of Commons of Canada from Quebec
Politicians from Quebec City
21st-century Canadian politicians
Quebec school board members